HR 4699 is a single star in the southern constellation of Corvus. It is orange in hue and is dimly visible to the naked eye with an apparent visual magnitude of +5.14. This star is located at a distance of approximately 201 light years from the Sun based on parallax. It is drifting further away with a radial velocity of +14 km/s, after come to within  some four million years ago.

This is an aging giant star with a stellar classification of K0 III, having exhausted the supply of hydrogen at its core then cooled and expanded to almost ten times the Sun's radius. It is nearly two billion years old with 1.76 times the mass of the Sun. The star is radiating 43 times the luminosity of the Sun from its photosphere at an effective temperature of 4,707 K.

References

K-type giants
Corvus (constellation)
Durchmusterung objects
107418
060221
4699